Vladimir Ambros (born 30 December 1993) is a Moldovan footballer who plays as a  forward for Petrocub Hîncești and the Moldova national team.

International career

International goals
Scores and results list Moldova's goal tally first.

References

External links

1993 births
Living people
Footballers from Chișinău
Moldovan footballers
Moldova international footballers
Moldovan Super Liga players
FC Rapid Ghidighici players
CS Petrocub Hîncești players
FC Sheriff Tiraspol players
Association football forwards